Papi is Belgian-French-Ugandan film that was written and directed by Belgian writer and director Kjell Clarysse. The film was shot on a shoestring budget of $15,000 (about Shs 54.5m) on location in Kampala, Belgium and France in 2015 but still got a successful premier in Belgium in 2017. It premiered in Uganda in February 2018.

Plot
In Kampala, a Congolese boda boda rider's life is changed for the worst when he meets a vengeful Ugandan girl seeking justice for her murdered mother and a European expatriate.

Cast
The cast is led by Belgian-based Congolese actor Papy Tshifuaka and joined by Ugandan actors including Rehema Nanfuka, Deedan Muyira, Daniel Omara, Felix Bwanika and Wilberforce Mutete.

References

2018 films
Ugandan drama films
Belgian drama films
2010s English-language films
2010s French-language films
English-language Ugandan films
French-language Belgian films
2010s French films